The Screaming Mimi is a mystery novel by pulp writer Fredric Brown. It was first published in 1949 as a Dutton Guilt Edged Mystery. A shorter version of the book appeared in the October, 1949 issue of Mystery Book Magazine.

The plot follows an alcoholic journalist who struggles to maintain sobriety as he investigates a serial murderer who killed three women and injured a fourth.

Adaptations
The Screaming Mimi was officially adapted into a movie, Gerd Oswald's Screaming Mimi, in 1958.
The Bird with the Crystal Plumage was an unofficial adaptation by Dario Argento.

References

1949 American novels
American mystery novels
Novels by Fredric Brown
American novels adapted into films
E. P. Dutton books